Stephanie Vigil is an American politician who is a member of the Colorado House of Representatives from the 16th district, which is located in Colorado Springs and includes most or parts of Cragmor, Knob Hill, Old North End Historic District, Patty Jewett and the University of Colorado Colorado Springs. She was elected in 2022 and assumed office in January 2023.

Background 
Vigil was born in Monroe, Michigan and later moved to Colorado. Vigil is a community organizer and has been a essential worker for most of her life. She recently worked as a gig-working delivery driver for about five years.

Political career 
Vigil ran against Andres Pico in 2020 but ultimately lost to him in the general election. Her run for the seat in 2020 would later gain her recognition in the district. In the 2022 Colorado state house elections, Vigil defeated the Republican and Libertarian candidates with a plurality of the votes cast. She is El Paso County's first openly queer elected official.

Her legislative priorities include working on public education, housing, renter's rights and transportation.

Tenure 
As of the 2023 legislative session, Vigil is a member of the Energy & Environment and Transportation, Housing & Local Government committees. A bill co-proposed by Vigil passed committee review which aimed at extending free transit throughout the state via a seasonal program.

References

External links 

 Legislative website 
 Campaign website 

Democratic Party members of the Colorado House of Representatives
21st-century American politicians
Living people
People from Colorado Springs, Colorado
LGBT state legislators in Colorado
Women state legislators in Colorado
21st-century women politicians